Commodore Colin Douglas Maud, DSO & Bar, DSC & Bar (21 January 1903 – 22 April 1980) was a Royal Navy officer who during the Second World War commanded the destroyers Somali and Icarus and acted as beach master of Juno beach at the D-day landings. With a heavy black beard, he "possessed the outward appearance of a latter-day buccaneer and was endowed with exceptional boldness and tenacity to go with it". His blackthorn stick and dog Winnie provided an image when portrayed by Kenneth More in the film The Longest Day. He was described as "one of the most popular officers in the British Navy".

Early life and education
Maud was born on 21 January 1903 and educated at Edgeborough school, Guildford and Britannia Royal Naval College.

Royal Navy service

Early career
He was promoted to sub-lieutenant in 1924 and completed his Greenwich Lieutenants' course and submarine courses before joining the submarine  in 1925. He was promoted to lieutenant in 1925 and joined  in April 1927. From 1927 to 1931 he served in the destroyer  and the submarine . He became the commanding officer of the submarine  in April 1932. He joined the W-class destroyer  in 1932 and by October of the same year was second-in-command of the destroyer . He was promoted to lieutenant commander in 1933.

Destroyer command
Between July 1935 and early 1937 he commanded the 1919-vintage destroyer  before moving in May 1937 to the brand new destroyer Icarus, which operated in the North Sea at the beginning of World War II.

On 3 March 1940, in company with Express, Impulsive and Esk, Maud's Icarus laid a minefield, which claimed  ten days later. On 11 April 1940 Icarus captured the 8,514-ton German supply ship Alster and on 13 April took part in the Second Battle of Narvik. He received a clutch of awards during the summer of 1940: on 28 June 1940 the Distinguished Service Cross, on 11 July 1940 a bar to the same award, "for good services in the Royal Navy since the outbreak of War" and on 16 August 1940 a mention in despatches.

In early May 1941, Maud commanded Icarus during the hunt for Bismarck, escorting the battle cruiser  and the battleship . Poor weather meant that the destroyers were unable to keep up with the capital ships, and when Hood had been sunk, Icarus joined in the search for survivors, of which there were only three.

As commanding officer of Icarus, Maud participated in the evacuation of Dunkirk, in a raid on Spitzbergen, in the Malta convoys and on numerous Atlantic and Russian convoys.

Maud took over as captain of the destroyer  in September 1942 when her captain, Jack Eaton, was ill. Maud was rescued by Leading Seaman William Goad, who dived into the freezing water with a rope, for which Goad was awarded the Albert Medal. Of the 102 men on board, only 35 were rescued. Maud had spent an hour in the Arctic water and credited his survival to the fact that he had drunk a bottle of whisky after going overboard. As a result, he ordered men under his command to carry a bottle of whisky, which proved to be a popular order. On 1 December 1942 he was awarded the Distinguished Service Order.

Normandy beach master
Appointed as principal beach master of Juno beach during the Normandy landings in the rank of acting captain, Maud was responsible for marshalling troops, supplies and equipment through the beach zone, for evacuating casualties and prisoners of war and for salvaging wrecks and clearing beach obstacles. For conducting these difficult duties under fire and for several weeks afterwards, he was awarded a bar to his Distinguished Service Order.

Eight days after the first landings, Charles de Gaulle and his entourage were met by Maud (who was incongruously wearing shorts) when they landed in France. While de Gaulle met Montgomery, Maud drove Admiral d'Argenlieu, General Kœnig, Gaston Palewski and Colonel Boislambert to Bayeux in his jeep to prepare for de Gaulle's entrance to the city. The preparations included Maud driving round the streets of Bayeux carrying a French Resistance  leader shouting "General de Gaulle will speak at four o'clock on the Place du Chateau".

Walcheren
Maud was appointed as the deputy commander of the Flushing assault force, during the Allied attack on Walcheren Island. On 11 December 1945 he was mentioned in despatches "for distinguished service during the War in Europe".

Later career
, a new Bay-class anti-aircraft frigate, had been intended for the British Pacific Fleet. Maud commanded her from June 1945, taking her through her work up in Scotland but when Japan surrendered, she was sent instead to the Mediterranean Fleet. Maud was promoted to captain on 30 June 1947. On 25 November 1947 he was granted permission to wear the insignias of a Commander of the Order of Orange-Nassau, which had been conferred upon him by the Queen of the Netherlands in recognition of "services rendered to the Royal Netherlands Navy during the war". From 1948 to 1949 he commanded  as Senior Officer, Reserve Forces, Clyde area. From April 1949 – May 1951 he was deputy to Rear Admiral James Jefford, serving as the second-in-command of the Royal Pakistan Navy. From 1951 to 1953 he commanded the 4th Minesweeping Flotilla at Harwich, before moving to the Amphibious Warfare HQ as Director Amphibious Warfare (Material). His last appointment in the Royal Navy was as Commandant of the Amphibious Warfare Centre at Fremington, Devon, in the rank of commodore, second class. He retired from the Royal Navy in 1956.

The Longest Day
In the 1962 movie The Longest Day he was played by Kenneth More (who also served as a British naval officer in the Second World War). Winnie, his dog, was a German Shepherd, and Werner Pluskat already had a dog of the same breed in the film but Darryl F. Zanuck "improved upon history" by making Winnie an English Bulldog. Maud acted as a technical adviser on the film and provided More with the same shillelagh he had carried on D-Day.

Family
Maud married, firstly, Elizabeth (Betty) Gibson in 1926, with whom he had a son Ruan Maud, and secondly, Valerie Compston (née Bocquet), the ex-wife of Vice Admiral Sir Peter Compston, in 1967.

Death
Maud died in 1980 aged 77.

References

Royal Navy officers of World War II
Recipients of the Distinguished Service Cross (United Kingdom)
Companions of the Distinguished Service Order
Commanders of the Order of Orange-Nassau
1903 births
1980 deaths